{{DISPLAYTITLE:C12H20}}
The molecular formula C12H20 (molar mass: 164.29 g/mol, exact mass: 164.1565 u) may refer to:

 TH-dimer, or tetrahydromethylcyclopentadiene dimer
 [4.3.3]Propellane